The 1987–88 Iraqi National Clubs First Division was the 14th season of the competition since its foundation in 1974. Al-Rasheed won their second league title in a row, and also won the 1987–88 Iraq FA Cup to complete their second consecutive double.

League table

Results

Season statistics

Top scorers

Hat-tricks

References

External links
 Iraq Football Association

Iraqi Premier League seasons
1987–88 in Iraqi football
Iraq